Shikhar is a 2005 Indian Hindi-language drama film produced and directed by John Matthew Matthan. The film stars Ajay Devgn, Bipasha Basu, Shahid Kapoor and Amrita Rao in lead roles, while Manoj Joshi, Javed Sheikh, and Sushant Singh play other key roles. The music was composed by Viju Shah with cinematography by A. K. Bir and editing by Ajoy Varma. The film released on 30 December 2005.

The film revolves around an overambitious businessman (played by Devgn) who tricks a naive boy (played by Kapoor) in order to sell his land to him to build his tower projects.

Plot
The story is about Gaurav Gupta, a successful businessman who started with nothing and believes that only money can fuel his ambitions. When he interests himself on building a tower in an abandoned village, he makes his mind up and agrees to build it at any cost, with the support of crooked politician Amrit Patil. However, the owner of the land, Shrikant Vardhan, does not accept the tower to be built. Therefore, Gaurav tricks Shrikant's son Jaidev, who is infected by the get-rich-quick virus, to join his scheme.

Jaidev, while respecting his father's philosophy, falls hook line and sinker for Gaurav's gilt-edged dreams. Gaurav uses his girlfriend Natasha to charm Jaidev by pretending to be in love with him so that he supports them instead of his own father. Meanwhile, Shrikant hopes that his son will return to his roots. Gaurav and Natasha even trick him by pretending to be a construction/ad agency partnered with actor John Abraham. Jaidev falls for the plan with Gaurav blackmailing him along the way. Soon after learning about Gaurav's plan, Jaidev tries to stop him, but he is attacked in the process. Jaidev realizes his mistakes, apologizes to his father, and tries to fight against Gaurav. After learning this, a furious Gaurav sets the land on fire, but Jaidev eventually saves the land and the hostages. Soon, Gaurav and Amrit are arrested for their crimes, and the village land is saved. Jaidev reconciles with his father and starts to help the latter in his business.

Cast
 Ajay Devgn as Gaurav Gupta (G.G)
 Bipasha Basu as Natasha
 Shahid Kapoor as Jaidev Vardhan (Jai)
 Amrita Rao as Madhavi
 Manoj Joshi as corrupt minister Amrit Patil
 Sunil Rege as Chief Minister 
 Javed Sheikh as Srikant Vardhan
 Sushant Singh as Bhajanlal
 Akhil Mishra as Jadav
 Akhilendra Mishra as Irfan Bhai
 Farha Naaz as Kusum
 Ash Chandler as Ashton Raga
 Jaywant Wadkar as Gaurav's henchman
 Raj Zutshi as himself (cameo appearance)
 John Abraham as himself (cameo appearance)

Soundtrack

The film's soundtrack is composed by Viju Shah with lyrics penned by Sudhakar Sharma, Anita Sarkar, Chandrashekhar Rajit and Manohar Iyer.

Track list

References

External links
 
 

2005 films
2000s Hindi-language films
Films scored by Viju Shah
Indian drama films
2005 drama films
Films about globalization
Films based on American novels
Hindi-language drama films